Bernardo Vieira de Melo was the first Governor of Rio Grande do Norte in the colony of Brazil.

Family
Vieira was born in the parish of Muribeca (today Jaboatão dos Guararapes) in 1658, and began life as a colonial Brazilian backwoodsman.  He was the son of Captain Bernardo Vieira de Melo and Maria Camelo de Melo, and grandson of António de Vieira Melo who arrived in Pernambuco, coming from Portugal in 1654, shortly after the Dutch invasion. He married Catarina Leitão, daughter of Captain Gonçalo Leitão Arnoso.

Career
Vieira entered the military in 1675 and was made a captain-general on November 17, 1691. On January 8, 1695, he was appointed Captain-General of Rio Grande do Norte, and on September 25, 1709 Sergeant Major of the Third of Palmares, in which position he took an active part in War of the peddlers. In November 1710, Vieira was the first to call for the creation of a Republic in Brazil, an act for which he was arrested in Recife in 1712 and shipped to Lisbon with his son, André. He died in the Limoeiro prison in 1718.

See also 
Mascate War
History of Pernambuco

References

1658 births
1718 deaths
People from Jaboatão dos Guararapes